Diamanticeras is an extinct genus of Cretaceous-aged ammonite cephalopod belonging to the family Crioceratitidae. It is probably phyletically linked to genus Crioceratites. Their fossils were found in Chile and Argentina.

Description
This genus is a lineage of non-tuberculate species that is characteristic by its rewinded shells. Primary ribs are rounded, wide, sometimes bifurcating. They are crossing the venter without interruption and can be paired. Secondary ribs are more or less vigorous, weakened or erased at venter and they are also usually simple.

References

Ammonitida genera
Crioceratitidae
Early Cretaceous ammonites
Hauterivian life